Shizong County is under the administration of the prefecture-level city of Qujing, in the east of Yunnan province, China, bordering Guangxi to the southeast.

The Landian Yao people of Gaoliang Township are found in Xin'an, Dinglei, Xidu, Shanglongga, and Xialongga villages.

Administrative divisions
Shizong County has 3 subdistricts, 4 towns and 3 ethnic townships. 
3 subdistricts
 Danfeng
 Yangyue
 Datong
4 towns

3 ethnic townships
 Longqing Yi and Zhuang
 Wulong Zhuang
 Gaoliang Zhuang Miao and Yao

Climate

References

External links
Shizong County Official Website

County-level divisions of Qujing